The following events occurred in March 1953:

March 1, 1953 (Sunday)
 Joseph Stalin suffers a stroke after an all-night dinner with Soviet Union interior minister Lavrentiy Beria and future premiers Georgi Malenkov, Nikolai Bulganin, and Nikita Khrushchev. The stroke paralyzes the right side of his body and renders him unconscious until his death on March 5.
 Bernard Freyberg, 1st Baron Freyberg is made deputy constable and lieutenant governor of Windsor Castle.
Born: M. K. Stalin A.K.A Muthuvel Karunanidhi Stalin, Indian politician, 8th Chief Minister of Tamil Nadu. The name is not a coincidence, his father M. Karunanidhi A.K.A. M. Karunanidhi (Indian politician, 2nd Chief Minister of Tamil Nadu (though not in 1953) and writer) named him "Muthuvel Karunanidhi Stalin" after addressing a condolence meeting for Joseph Stalin's death on March 5. M. K. Stalin's son Udhayanidhi Stalin (Indian politician) also uses the "Stalin" name.

March 2, 1953 (Monday)

March 3, 1953 (Tuesday)
During takeoff from Karachi Airport in Karachi, Pakistan, for a ferry/positioning flight, the pilot of the Canadian Pacific Air Lines De Havilland DH.106 Comet 1A Empress of Hawaii lifts the plane's nose too high to enable it to become airborne. The aircraft crashes into a dry riverbed, killing all 11 of those on board.
Died: James J. Jeffries, American boxing champion (heart attack)

March 4, 1953 (Wednesday)

March 5, 1953 (Thursday)
Died:
Herman J. Mankiewicz, American writer and producer (b. 1897)
Sergei Prokofiev, Russian composer (b. 1891)
Joseph Stalin, Soviet leader (b. 1878)

March 6, 1953 (Friday)
Georgy Maksimilianovich Malenkov succeeds Joseph Stalin as Premier and First Secretary of the Communist Party of the Soviet Union.

March 7, 1953 (Saturday)
1953 Queensland state election and 1953 South Australian state election: The Australian states of Queensland and South Australia hold elections for the Queensland Legislative Assembly and South Australian House of Assembly. The result is an increased majority for the Labor Party in Queensland whilst the Liberal and Country League retain power in South Australia.
Died: Edward Sedgwick, American director (b. 1892)

March 8, 1953 (Sunday)

March 9, 1953 (Monday)

March 10, 1953 (Tuesday)
Born: Debbie Brill, Canadian athlete, in Mission, British Columbia

March 11, 1953 (Wednesday)

March 12, 1953 (Thursday)
A 3-day tornado outbreak begins in parts of the United States. It will eventually cause at least 21 deaths and millions of dollars' worth of damage.

March 13, 1953 (Friday)
1953 United Nations Secretary-General selection: In the first round of voting, all three candidates are rejected.
Died: Johan Laidoner, Commander-in-chief of the Estonian Army (b. 1884)

March 14, 1953 (Saturday)
Nikita Khrushchev is selected First Secretary of the Soviet Communist Party.
Died: Klement Gottwald, 56, 5th President of Czechoslovakia, already suffering from a variety of health problems, from the after-effects of a burst artery or from pneumonia contracted at Stalin's funeral.

March 15, 1953 (Sunday)
The 20th Ice Hockey World Championships end in Switzerland, with Sweden winning for the first time. Canada and the Soviet Union do not compete. Czechoslovakia, originally due to play Sweden on the last day, had withdrawn the day before because of the death of the country's president.
The 1953 Paris–Nice cycle race ends at Nice, and is won by Jean-Pierre Munch.

March 16, 1953 (Monday)
Born: Isabelle Huppert, French actress, in

March 17, 1953 (Tuesday)
An Aigle Azur Douglas C-47A Skytrain (registration F-BEFG) crashes on approach to Da Nang Airport in Da Nang, French Indochina. The plane catches fire, killing all eight occupants.
The first nuclear test of Operation Upshot–Knothole is conducted in Nevada, United States, with 1,620 spectators at 3.4 km (2.1 mi).
Born: Filemon Lagman ("Ka Popoy"), Filipino revolutionary, in Bicol (d. 2001)

March 18, 1953 (Wednesday)
An earthquake hits western Turkey, killing at least 1,070 people.
The final of the 1953 NCAA basketball tournament for men is held in Kansas City, Missouri, United States, and is won by the Indiana Hoosiers.

March 19, 1953 (Thursday)
The 25th Academy Awards ceremony is held (the first one broadcast on television).
The 44th Milan–San Remo cycle race is held in Italy and is won by Loretto Petrucci.

March 20, 1953 (Friday)
Died: Graciliano Ramos, Brazilian writer (b. 1892)

March 21, 1953 (Saturday)

March 22, 1953 (Sunday)
Born: Esme Steyn, South African lawn bowler, in Durban

March 23, 1953 (Monday)
Died:
Raoul Dufy, French painter (b. 1875)
Oskar Luts, Estonian writer and playwright (b. 1887)

March 24, 1953 (Tuesday)
Died:
Queen Mary, consort of George V of the United Kingdom, 85
Paul Couturier, French priest (b. 1881)

March 25, 1953 (Wednesday)
Beginning of the Lari Massacre in Kenya: Mau Mau rebels kill up to 150 Kikuyu natives.

March 26, 1953 (Thursday)
End of the Lari Massacre.
Jonas Salk announces the development of a polio vaccine.

March 27, 1953 (Friday)
 1953 New York Central Railroad accident: Three trains collide on the four-track mainline 2.4 miles east of Conneaut, Ohio, United States, resulting in 21 deaths.

March 28, 1953 (Saturday)
The World Professional Match-play Championship snooker tournament ends in London, UK, and is won by defending champion, Fred Davis.
Born: Melchior Ndadaye, President of Burundi 1993, in Nyabihanga (assassinated 1993)
Died: Jim Thorpe, 65, Native-American athlete and a member of the Pro Football Hall of Fame

March 29, 1953 (Sunday)
A fire at the Littlefield Nursing Home in Largo, Florida, United States, kills 33 persons.
The 1953 World Table Tennis Championships end in Bucharest. The Swaythling Cup for the men's team is won by England and the Corbillon Cup for the women's team by Romania.
The 15th Gent–Wevelgem cycle race is held in Belgium and is won by Raymond Impanis.
Died: Arthur Fields, 68, American baritone singer, a victim of the Littlefield Nursing Home fire

March 30, 1953 (Monday)
The United Nations Security Council nominates Dag Hammarskjöld as United Nations Secretary General.

March 31, 1953 (Tuesday)
The Barnsley by-election, necessitated by the resignation of long-serving MP Sidney Schofield, takes place in the UK, leading to the election of another Labour member, Roy Mason.
Died: Ivan Lebedeff, Russian actor (b. 1895)

References

1953
1953-03
1953-03